This is the list of cathedrals in Zambia sorted by denomination.

Roman Catholic 
Cathedrals of the Roman Catholic Church in Zambia:
 Cathedral of St. Anne in Chipata
 Cathedral of the Sacred Heart in Kabwe
 Cathedral of St. John the Apostle in Kasama
 Cathedral of St. Theresa in Livingstone
 Cathedral of the Child Jesus in Lusaka
 Cathedral of the Assumption of Our Lady in Mansa
 Cathedral of Our Lady of Lourdes in Mongu
 Cathedral of Our Lady of Lourdes in Monze
 Cathedral of St. Joseph the Worker in Mpika
 Cathedral of Christ the King in Ndola
 Cathedral of St. Daniel in Solwezi

Anglican
Cathedrals of the Church of the Province of Central Africa in Zambia:
 Cathedral of the Holy Nativity in Ndola
 Cathedral of St Michael's in Kitwe
 Cathedral of the Holy Cross in Lusaka
 St Luke’s Cathedral in Msoro

See also
List of cathedrals

References

 
Cathedrals
Zambia
Cathedrals